Rebberg may refer to:

 Rebberg (Mulhouse), a mountain and suburb of Mulhouse in France
 Rebberg (Gundelfingen), a hill in Gundelfingen in Southern Germany

See also
 Rehberg (disambiguation)